Geritola daveyi, the Davey's epitola, is a butterfly in the family Lycaenidae. It is found in eastern Nigeria and along the coast of Cameroon. The habitat consists of forests.

References

Butterflies described in 1954
Poritiinae